Shenley is a village in Hertfordshire, England.

Shenley  may also refer to:

Places
Shenley, Milton Keynes, Buckinghamshire, England
Shenley, Quebec, Saint-Honoré-de-Shenley, Canada
Shenley Green, Birmingham, West Midlands, England
Shenley railway station, a former station at Canterbury, Melbourne, Australia

Other uses
Shenley Academy, a secondary school in Weoley Castle, Birmingham, England